Gerald Thomas Burch (born December 13, 1939) is a former American football tight end in the American Football League (AFL) with the Oakland Raiders. He played collegiately for the Georgia Tech football team.

1939 births
Living people
American football tight ends
Georgia Tech Yellow Jackets football players
Oakland Raiders players